Ingunn Gjerstad (born 26 May 1963) is a Norwegian politician for the Socialist Left Party.

She served as a deputy representative to the Parliament of Norway from Oslo during the terms 2005–2009 and 2013–2017. As Heikki Holmås was a member of the outgoing Stoltenberg's Second Cabinet in 2013, Gjerstad met as a regular representative during the two weeks before the cabinet change.

References

1963 births
Living people
Politicians from Oslo
Socialist Left Party (Norway) politicians
Centre Party (Norway) politicians
Members of the Storting
Women members of the Storting